Lilian Gertrude Woolf, better known as Lilian Wolfe (22 December 1875 in London – 28 April 1974 in Cheltenham), was an English  anarchist, pacifist and feminist. She was for most of her life a member of the Freedom Press publishing collective.

Early life and radicalisation
Wolfe was born in her father's jewellery shop on Edgware Road, London on 22 December 1875. Her mother, Lucy Helen Jones, was an actress from Birmingham whom Wolfe would describe as "a very frustrated woman" who left the family when Wolfe was thirteen years of age in order tour the world with an operatic company, while her father, Albert Lewis Woolf was a Liverpudlian jeweller of Jewish descent and of a conservative outlook. She had three brothers and two sisters, and had a comfortable and orthodox middle-class upbringing, educated first by governesses and later for a short period at the Regent Street Polytechnic.

As an employee of the General Post Office, Wolfe was an active member of the Civil Service Socialist Society. She became disillusioned with parliamentary politics as a suffragette, and came to consider the granting of the voting franchise to women a mere "palliative". She was thus attracted to the British anarchist movement and was a founding contributor to the anarchist periodical The Voice of Labour.

Activism and later years
In 1916, following the introduction of conscription by the Military Service Act, The Voice of Labour published an article on civil disobedience which encouraged readers to dodge the draft and go into hiding in the Scottish Highlands. Wolfe was arrested during a subsequent raid of Freedom offices along with her partner Thomas Keell. They were charged and found guilty under the Defence of the Realm Act. Wolfe received a sentence of a £25 fine or two months in prison. She chose the latter. Keell too chose prison over payment, though his sentence was for £100 or three months respectively. In prison however, the forty-year-old Wolfe discovered that she was pregnant and so paid the fine and secured her release.

She lived in Marsh House in London with Nellie Dick, Fred Dunn, and Gaston Marin in 1917, with Keell, their son and W C Owen in Willesden around 1920, and with Keell in the Tolstoyan Whiteway Colony, Gloucestershire from the 1920s until his death in 1938. At Whiteway, she cared for a time for Richard Blair, the son of George Orwell, when the writer was incapacitated in a sanitorium. When Vernon Richards established the periodical Spain and the World in support of the Spanish anarchists in the civil war, Wolfe (aged 60) acted as its administrator. During this time, she would stay in with Richards and his partner Marie-Louise Berneri in London. She was still politically active well into her old age, selling Peace News in her 90s and acting as manager and administrator of the Freedom Press bookshop until the age of 95. Until shortly before her death from a stroke at the age of 98 she was still active in National Council for Civil Liberties and War Resisters International.

In the centennial edition of Freedom, anarchist historian Nicolas Walter hailed Wolfe as "one of the least public but most important figures in the Freedom Press for more than half a century".

See also
 List of peace activists

References

Bibliography

Further reading 

 

1875 births
1974 deaths
Anarcho-pacifists
Anarcha-feminists
English anarchists
Socialist feminists
Pacifist feminists